The Yeonil O clan was one of the Korean clans. Their Bon-gwan was in Pohang, North Gyeongsang Province. According to the research in 1985, the number of Yeonil O clan was 1166.

See also 
 Korean clan names of foreign origin

References

External links 
 

Korean clan names of Chinese origin